Plotnikovo is a rural locality (a selo) in Plotnikovsky Selsoviet, Kamensky District, Altai Krai, Russia. The population was 75 as of 2013. There are 5 streets.

Geography 
Plotnikovo is located 38 km southeast of Kamen-na-Obi (the district's administrative centre) by road. Lugovoye is the nearest rural locality.

References 

Rural localities in Kamensky District, Altai Krai